Congoglanis is a genus of loach catfishes found in the Congo River system of Africa.  This genus is considered the sister group of all other species in the subfamily Doumeinae.

Species
There are currently four recognized species in this genus:
 Congoglanis alula (Nichols & Griscom, 1917)
 Congoglanis howesi Vari, Ferraris & P. H. Skelton, 2012
 Congoglanis inga Ferraris, Vari & P. H. Skelton, 2011
 Congoglanis sagitta Ferraris, Vari & P. H. Skelton, 2011

References

Amphiliidae

Congo drainage basin
Catfish genera
Freshwater fish genera